Ravanna is a 2000 Telugu-language action film directed by B. Gopal. Rajasekhar, Soundarya and Krishna played the lead roles. The film was theatrically released on 3 March 2000.  It was dubbed and released in Hindi as Jaan Ki Baazi 2 by Goldmines Telefilms on 23 January 2020.

Synopsis 
The movie story deals with Ravanna, a wayward youth, is misguided and used by the local MLA to threaten those who oppose his corrupt activities. The arrival of a retired army major and his sister in the village turns things around.

Cast
Rajasekhar as Ravanna
Krishna as Retired Army Major
Soundarya as Panthulamma Sirisha
Sanghavi 
Narra Venkateswara Rao
Jaya Prakash Reddy
Vijayakumar
M. S. Narayana as Sarpam (Sarpanch) Samara Pulla Reddy
Venu Madhav
Kallu Chidambaram

Soundtrack

References

2000 films
2000s Telugu-language films
Films directed by B. Gopal
2000s masala films
Films scored by S. A. Rajkumar
Films with screenplays by Posani Krishna Murali